Kellafate is a 2010 Indian film in the Bengali language romantic comedy film directed by Pijush Saha. It is a remake of 2007 Telugu film Aata

It is the debut film of Ankush.

Plot 
Shibhu works in Kolkata as a projector machine operator, but he dreams of becoming a movie actor. Soon, he falls in love with Pallabi, who is already committed to Bobby, the home minister's son.

Cast
 Ankush Hazra as Shibu
 Rupashree as Pallabi
 Rajatava Dutta as Police Officer
 Supriyo Dutta as Home Minister
 Biswajit Chakraborty
 Surajit Sen

Music

References

External links
 Kellafate at the Internet Movie Database
 Kellafate in Gomolo

Bengali-language Indian films
Films scored by Jeet Ganguly
2010 films
2010s Bengali-language films
Bengali remakes of Telugu films
Bengali action comedy films